Wittgendorf is a village and a former municipality in the district Saalfeld-Rudolstadt, in Thuringia, Germany. Since July 2018, it is part of the town Saalfeld.

References

Former municipalities in Thuringia
Saalfeld-Rudolstadt
Schwarzburg-Rudolstadt